The Valea Mare is a left tributary of the river Olt in Romania. It flows into the Olt in Dopca. The Dopca Dam is located on this river.

References

Rivers of Romania
Rivers of Brașov County